Arthington is a small village in Wharfedale, in the City of Leeds metropolitan borough in West Yorkshire, England.

Arthington may also refer to:

People with the given name
 Arthington Worsley (1861–1944), a British botanist, explorer and civil engineer

People with the surname
 Henry Arthington (1615–1671), an English politician who sat in the House of Commons 
 Robert Arthington (1823–1900), a British investor, philanthropist and premillennialist

Other uses
 Arthington, Liberia, a small town in Montserrado County
 Arthington Viaduct
 Arthington Priory
 Arthington railway station